On 3 August 2021 in a collision between a passenger bus and a truck in Ségou, Mali has killed at least 41 people and 33 others injured.

Background
The accident happened about 20 Km away from the town of Ségou when a truck driver lost control after the tire exploded and crashed into the bus.

Reactions
Mali's president Assimi Goïta has declared three days of national mourning across the country.

References

2021 in Mali
Bus incidents in Africa
Ségou Region
August 2021 events in Africa
Road incidents in Mali